Satara state was a short-lived Kingdom later Princely state in India created after the fall of the Maratha Confederacy in 1818 after the Third Anglo-Maratha War and annexed by them in 1849 using the Doctrine of lapse. The state was ruled by the Bhonsle dynasty, descendants of Chhatrapati Shivaji, the founder of the Maratha Empire. The first Raja of the state was Pratap Singh who was freed by the British after they defeated Peshwa Bajirao II in 1818. Pratap Singh was deposed in 1838. His brother, Shahaji succeeded him but died without a natural heir in 1848. At that time, the East India Company government refused to accept Shahaji's adopted son as his successor under the company's Doctrine of lapse, a policy introduced by the then Governor, Lord Dalhousie, and absorbed  the territory into the growing British dominion.
Many prominent, influential and politically important families such as the Satara Chitnis Family currently own multiple Wadas (A style of large mansion found in western India) in Satara as well.

See also 
 Kolhapur State
 Maratha Empire
 Khando Ballal Chitnis ( a person from the Satara Chitnis family.)

References

History of Maharashtra
Maratha Empire
1818 establishments in India
1848 disestablishments
Empires and kingdoms of India
Princely states of Maharashtra